The women's 4 × 100 metre medley relay event at the 2010 Asian Games took place on 13 November 2010 at Guangzhou Aoti Aquatics Centre.

There were 8 teams who took part in this event. China won the gold medal, Japan and Hong Kong won the silver and bronze medal respectively.

Schedule
All times are China Standard Time (UTC+08:00)

Records

Results

References
 16th Asian Games Results

External links 
 Women's 4 × 100m Medley Relay Ev.No.6 Final Official Website

Swimming at the 2010 Asian Games